Huo Liujun (born 13 August 1960) is a Chinese politician currently serving as party secretary of Xinjiang Uygur Autonomous Regional Public Security Department since March 2017.

Biography
Born on 13 August 1960, he assumed various posts in the Xinjiang Uygur Autonomous Regional Public Security Department, where he was promoted to deputy chief in August 2015 and party secretary, the top political position in the department, in March 2017.

On 9 July 2020, the United States government imposed Global Magnitsky Human Rights Accountability Act sanctions and visa restrictions against him for his connection to similar human rights abuse against the ethnic minorities in Xinjiang.

In July 2010, he was promoted to the rank of major general (Shaojiang).

References

1960 births
Living people
People's Liberation Army generals
Chinese Communist Party politicians